Bremer Woll-Kämmerei (BWK) is a worldwide operating company for manufacturing wool and trading in wool and similar products. The company is located in Bremen and has branches in Australia, New Zealand and Turkey. For some time it has been the world's largest company in this special section of economy.

History
The origin Bremer Woll-Kämmerei was founded in 1883 as a joint stock company. Investors were the consuls Albrecht, Weinlich and Delius, the merchants H. Claussen, J. Fritze, J. Hachez and C. Kulenkampff. Ferdinand Ullrich became business director and Paul Zschörner technical director. Zschörner chose an area of 500,000 squaremetres between the River Weser and the Blumenthaler Aue. On 11 September 1884 the production started with 150 workers. In 1896 already 2000 workers were busy, and the number increased to 3700 until 1930.

A new branch near Istanbul (Turkey) started production in 2003. Since 20 March 2007 the company was no longer listed on the Bremen Stock Exchange, the main shareholder and investor Elders took 100% of the Aktiengesellschaft. So an important part of the history of the Bremen Stock Exchange finished after 119 years.

The shareholders decided to close the production facilities in Bremen during the year 2009.

References

External links
 

Companies based in Bremen
German companies established in 1883
Manufacturing companies based in Bremen (state)
Textile companies of Germany
Manufacturing companies established in 1883